(fl. 1743) was a Japanese samurai of the Edo period. A senior retainer of the Sendai domain, he was first known as Kagehiro (景寛). Murakiyo was the eighth Katakura Kojūrō. His childhood name was Shigekuro (繁九郎) later Yuunosuke (勇之助) later changed to Kojuro.

Family
 Foster Father: Katakura Murasada
 Father: Matsumae Hirotaka
 Wife: Gohime
 Children:
 Katakura Katayoshi
 Katakura Muratsune by Concubine
 Daughter married Date Muratomo

External links
Katakura family tree (in Japanese)
Katakura-related timeline (in Japanese)

Samurai
Katakura clan
18th-century Japanese people